Blake Cochrane,  (born 25 January 1991) is a retired Australian Paralympic swimmer. He won a silver medal at the 2008 Beijing Paralympics, two gold medals at the 2012 London Paralympics, a silver medal at the 2016 Rio Paralympics, and a silver and one bronze medal at the 2020 Tokyo Paralympics.

Personal
Blake John Cochrane born on 25 January 1991 in Charleville, Queensland. He has multiple congenital limb deficiencies affecting his hands and his feet.  In December 2017, he graduated from University of the Sunshine Coast with Bachelor of Clinical Exercise Science. Cochrane and his wife Lauran have a son.

Cochrane announced his retirement from swimming in July 2022.

Swimming
Cochrane's parents enrolled him in swimming in an effort to alleviate his asthma. He began swimming competitively at age 16. It was not until his selection by Swimming Australia as an AWD (Athlete with a Disability) team competitor at the Arafura Games in Darwin, 2007, that his potential was realised.

Cochrane went on to win a silver medal at the 2008 Beijing Games in the Men's 100 m Breaststroke SB7 event.

After Beijing 2008, Cochrane continued to perform strongly in the pool. He was one of the stars of the 2009 World Short Course Championships, winning two gold medals and one silver. He has been honoured with Blue awards by both University of Queensland, 2010 and the University of the Sunshine Coast, 2011. He blitzed the field at the 2011 Para Pan Pacific Championships in Canada, winning five gold medals and breaking the world record in the 100m breaststroke. 2010 was an especially prolific year for Blake as he won gold in the 100m breaststroke at the World Championships, before snaring a bronze medal at the Commonwealth Games in Delhi. During the 2012 Australian Swimming Nationals he again set a new world record in the 100m breaststroke (SB8) final. Competing at the 2012 London Games, he competed in five events and won two gold medals in the Men's 100 m Breaststroke SB7 and Men's 4 × 100 m Freestyle 34 points.

At the 2013 IPC Swimming World Championships in Montreal, Quebec, Canada, Cochrane broke the world record in winning the gold medal in the Men's 100 m Breaststroke SB7.

Competing at the 2015 IPC Swimming World Championships in Glasgow, Scotland, Cochrane won the silver medal in the Men's 100 m Breaststroke SB7 and a bronze medal in the Men's 4 × 100 m Freestyle Relay 34 points. He finished fourth in Men's 4 × 100 m Medley Relay 34pts, fifth in the Men's 50m Freestyle S8 and Men's 100m Freestyle S8.

In 2015, Cochrane was coached by Jan Cameron at the University of the Sunshine Coast.

At the 2016 Rio Paralympics, Cochrane won the silver medal in Men's 100 m Breaststroke SB7. He also competed in Men's 4 × 100 m Freestyle (34 points) and finished fifth, seventh in Men's 400m Freestyle S8 but didn't progress to the finals in Men's 50m Freestyle S8 and Men's 100m Freestyle S8.

In preparation for Rio, Cochrane coaches states "Blake never thought he had any disability ... and never looked back."

At the 2019 World Para Swimming Championships in London, Cochrane won the bronze medal in the Men's 100 m Breaststroke SB7.

Cochrane competed at the 2020 Tokyo Paralympics in the Men's 100 m breaststroke SB7. He won the bronze medal with a time of 1:16.97, close to 5 seconds behind the winner Carlos Serrano Zarate of Columbia. He participated in the heats of the 34pts 4x100m Medley but not in the final.

At the 2022 Birmingham Commonwealth Games, he won the bronze medal in the Men's 100 breaststroke SB8.

Cochrane is coached by Nathan Doyle at USC Spartans.

Recognition
In 2011, Cochrane was a nominee for The Ages Sport Performer Award in the Performer with a Disability category. In 2011, he won Swimming Australia's Swimmer with a Disability of the Year Award.  He has been awarded the 'Graham Sherman Sunshine Coast Senior Sports Star of the Year' for 2013. He was awarded a Medal of the Order of Australia in the 2014 Australia Day Honours "for service to sport as a Gold Medallist at the London 2012 Paralympic Games."

See also
 Australia at the Paralympics
 Disabled sports

References

Further reading

External links
 
 
 
 
 
 
 
 
 

1991 births
Living people
Australian male freestyle swimmers
Australian male breaststroke swimmers
S8-classified Paralympic swimmers
Male Paralympic swimmers of Australia
Paralympic bronze medalists for Australia
Paralympic gold medalists for Australia
Paralympic medalists in swimming
Paralympic silver medalists for Australia
Swimmers at the 2008 Summer Paralympics
Swimmers at the 2012 Summer Paralympics
Swimmers at the 2016 Summer Paralympics
Swimmers at the 2020 Summer Paralympics
Medalists at the 2008 Summer Paralympics
Medalists at the 2012 Summer Paralympics
Medalists at the 2016 Summer Paralympics
Medalists at the 2020 Summer Paralympics
Commonwealth Games bronze medallists for Australia
Commonwealth Games medallists in swimming
Commonwealth Games silver medallists for Australia
Swimmers at the 2010 Commonwealth Games
Swimmers at the 2014 Commonwealth Games
Swimmers at the 2018 Commonwealth Games
Swimmers at the 2022 Commonwealth Games
Medalists at the World Para Swimming Championships
Recipients of the Medal of the Order of Australia
21st-century Australian people
Medallists at the 2010 Commonwealth Games
Medallists at the 2014 Commonwealth Games
Medallists at the 2018 Commonwealth Games
Medallists at the 2022 Commonwealth Games